Pegasus V (formerly Princess Mariana) is a yacht originally built for Carlos Peralta, head of lusacell (now AT&T Mexico). The yacht was ordered in 2002 at the Danyard A/S Frederikshavn shipyard in Denmark. One year later Princess Mariana was delivered by Royal Denship. In 2006 she was the 33rd largest yacht in the world. Ron Tutor owned Pegasus V in 2012.

Design 

Sales
In 2008 it was listed for sale for €125,000,000. That amount was reduced to €98,000,000 in 2009.
May 2011 saw the sale of Princess Mariana at an asking price of $98,000,000. Following the transaction, she was renamed Pegasus V and made available for charter. Ron Tutor threw a party listing Pegasus V for sale for $95 million in 2012. The selling price was reduced $6 million to $88 million in 2013.

See also
 List of motor yachts by length

References 

Motor yachts
Ships built in Denmark
2002 ships